This is a listing of the horses that finished in either first, second, or third place and the number of starters in the Selima Stakes, an American stakes race for fillies two years-old at 1-1/16 miles (8.5 furlongs) on the turf held at Laurel Park Racecourse in Laurel, Maryland.  (List 1986–present)

References

External links
 The Selima Stakes at Pedigree Query

Laurel Park Racecourse